Psychrobacter marincola is a Gram-negative, psychrophilic, moderately halophilic, aerobic oxidase- and catalase-positive, non-pigmented non-spore-forming, nonmotile bacterium of the genus  Psychrobacter, which was isolated from the Indian Ocean.

References

External links
Type strain of Psychrobacter marincola at BacDive -  the Bacterial Diversity Metadatabase

Moraxellaceae
Bacteria described in 2002
Psychrophiles